Jim Scherr (born July 27, 1961) is a former American wrestler and former U.S. Olympic Committee CEO. He competed in the men's freestyle 90 kg at the 1988 Summer Olympics.

References

1961 births
Living people
American male sport wrestlers
Olympic wrestlers of the United States
Wrestlers at the 1988 Summer Olympics
People from Eureka, South Dakota
Pan American Games medalists in wrestling
Pan American Games bronze medalists for the United States
Wrestlers at the 1987 Pan American Games
Medalists at the 1987 Pan American Games